Francisco Fernandes da Conceição (born 14 December 2002) is a Portuguese professional footballer who plays as a forward for Eredivisie club Ajax and the Portugal under-21 national team.

Club career

Early career 
Francisco Conceição joined Sporting's academy at the age of eight, spending six seasons at the club. He spent a season at Porto's feeder club Padroense before joining Porto's youth setup in 2018.

Porto 
In August 2020, Conceição signed his first professional contract with the club, and made his professional debut in a 1–0 loss against Varzim during the 2020–21 Liga Portugal 2 season. He made his debut in the Portuguese top tier in a 2–2 draw against Boavista, on 13 February 2021; four days later, he became the second youngest Porto player to feature in a UEFA Champions League match, coming on in the last minutes of a 2–1 win against Juventus in the round of 16 of the 2020–21 season.

In 2021–22, Conceição played 33 total games as Porto won a league and cup double; only four were starts, including one in the league. He contributed three goals, beginning with a penalty to conclude a 5–1 home win over Feirense in the fourth round of the Taça de Portugal; his first league goal on 8 January won the game 3–2 at Estoril two minutes after coming on for Fábio Cardoso.

Ajax 
On 21 July 2022, Conceição signed with Eredivisie club Ajax, on a five-year contract. Nine days later, he was an unused substitute as they lost the 2022 Johan Cruyff Shield 5–3 to PSV Eindhoven. He made his debut for the reserves on 8 August, equalising in a 1–1 Eerste Divisie draw at home to SC Telstar; his first-team debut came on 3 September in a 4–0 home win over SC Cambuur, replacing double goalscorer Steven Bergwijn after 61 minutes. On 1 November 2022, he scored his first goal for the club against Rangers F.C., in a 1-3 victory in the UEFA Champions League.

Style of play
Conceição's early promise and his small stature (1.70 m), led to comparisons to Lionel Messi in the Portuguese press, with him sometimes being nicknamed "Messi do Olival" (Olival's Messi) by fans and in media outlets.

Personal life
Born in Coimbra, Conceição is the fourth son of former Portugal international footballer and current manager Sérgio Conceição; his older brothers Sérgio and Rodrigo are also professional footballers.

Career statistics

Club

Honours
Porto
Primeira Liga: 2021–22
Taça de Portugal: 2021–22

References

External links
Profile at the AFC Ajax website

2002 births
Living people
Sportspeople from Coimbra
Portuguese footballers
Portugal youth international footballers
Association football forwards
Sporting CP footballers
Padroense F.C. players
FC Porto players
AFC Ajax players
Jong Ajax players
Primeira Liga players
Liga Portugal 2 players
Eredivisie players
Eerste Divisie players
Portuguese expatriate footballers
Expatriate footballers in the Netherlands
Portuguese expatriate sportspeople in the Netherlands